Die Fledermaus is a 1923 German silent film directed by Max Mack and starring Eva May, Lya De Putti and Harry Liedtke. It is an adaptation of the operetta Die Fledermaus by Johann Strauss II, Karl Haffner and Richard Genée.

The film's sets were designed by the art director Ernst Stern.

Cast
 Eva May as Rosalinde
 Lya De Putti as Adele
 Harry Liedtke as Gabriel von Eisenstein
 Paul Heidemann as Falke
 Ilka Grüning as Rosalindes Mutter
 Albert Patry as Rosalindes Vater
 Wilhelm Bendow as Alfred
 Jakob Tiedtke as Frosch
 Ernst Hofmann as Prinz Orlowsky
 Hans Junkermann as Gefängnisdirektor
 Hermann Picha as Sekretär bei Falke
 Paul Graetz as Botenjunge
 Hugo Döblin as Balettmeister

References

Bibliography

External links

1923 films
Films of the Weimar Republic
German silent feature films
Films directed by Max Mack
Films based on operettas
Films set in Vienna
German black-and-white films